Jaan Paan Liqueur is a sweet paan-flavoured spirit/liqueur. It is made with neutral grain spirit, Canadian maple syrup and a blend of herbs and spices, excluding areca nut.

It is produced and bottled in Toronto, Ontario, Canada. Jaan has an alcohol content of 25% (alc/vol) (50 proof) and in 2011 the Spirits International Prestige Awards gave it a Platinum Medal.

See also

 List of foods made from maple

References

External links 
 Official Website
 Proof 66 Ratings and Reviews for Jaan Paan Liqueur
 AMERICANcocktails Review of Jaan Paan Liqueur
Liqueurs
Food made from maple
Canadian brands